Christopher Paul Neil (born February 6, 1975), also known as Mr. Swirl,  Swirl Face, or Vico (nicknamed after the Interpol operation concerning him), is a Canadian convicted child molester.  He was the subject of a highly publicized Interpol investigation of the sexual abuse of at least 12 young boys in Vietnam, Cambodia, and Thailand, primarily owing to the Internet release of pornographic images depicting the abuse. He was arrested by Thai police in October 2007.

Life 
Neil was born in New Westminster, British Columbia, Canada, and raised and educated in Maple Ridge, British Columbia. There he taught and studied to become a Catholic priest. The Seminary of Christ the King in Mission, British Columbia did not permit Neil to become a priest due to him not being qualified, and he chose to go into teaching instead.

Interpol search and capture 

Neil appeared in more than 200 photographs depicting child sexual abuse, which surfaced on the Internet and led to a worldwide manhunt known as Operation Vico. Neil's face had been obscured by a digital swirl in the photographs, but German computer experts at the Federal Criminal Police Office were able to reconstruct the original picture using techniques similar to that used by Neil, but in reverse.

Several of these reconstructed pictures were posted on Interpol's website and led to more than 350 people contacting the organization, five of whom identified the man as Neil. Neil was working as an English teacher at Kwangju Foreign School in the city of Gwangju, South Korea, at the time but fled with a one-way ticket to Thailand once he was publicly identified.  He was arrested in the Nakhon Ratchasima Province, in the Isan region of northeast Thailand, on October 19, 2007. Thai police reportedly located the fugitive by means of a trace on the mobile phone of his 25-year-old Thai partner, who was himself identified in the beach town of Pattaya.
While Neil was teaching in Thailand, he allegedly employed the services of a Thai to bring young boys from internet cafes to his apartment to perform sexual services. As Neil arrived at the Royal Thai National Police Headquarters he was met by around 300 journalists, which resulted in a stampede.

On January 11, 2008, the start of his trial was set for March 10. He pleaded not guilty. On March 10 it was found that Neil did not have a lawyer. One was assigned to him and the trial was adjourned to June 2. He was sentenced on August 15, 2008 to 39 months in prison and a $1,780 fine.  His original sentence of 6 years was reduced by about half because he later admitted to the crime. On November 24, 2008, his sentence was extended by six years following his conviction for molesting a second child.

Return to Canada 
After five years' incarceration in Thailand, on September 29, 2012, Neil returned to Canada, whereupon he was immediately arrested at Vancouver International Airport under a Criminal Code 810.1 warrant.  On October 3, 2012, he was released from custody on strict conditions. On August 2, 2013, Neil was arrested at his home for breach of recognizance. He pleaded guilty in October. Child pornography was found on his laptop and his mobile phone. His sentencing occurred on May 6, 2014, at which time he received a prison sentence of three months' plus three years of probation for breach of conditions, namely "possessing devices capable of accessing the internet". Neil was already in custody, having been denied bail on April 10, 2014, pending a criminal trial stemming from additional child sex abuse offences he is alleged to have committed in Cambodia.

In December 2015, he was sentenced to five and a half years in prison by a British Columbia court, which was later reduced to 15 months. He was released in March 2017 and is currently living in Vancouver with a court-ordered restriction on certain behaviours including "contact with minors in person or on the internet... [and] possessing or accessing any electronic device or from getting any other person to do so on his behalf."

Extended search for others

Thai police expanded the hunt for potential child sex offenders by publishing photographs of 50 Western suspects identified by international authorities, many of whom are German citizens. Other nationalities include British, Australian, Italian, Finnish and American. On May 6, 2008, Interpol launched Operation IDent, its second public appeal to identify an unknown child abuse suspect, who featured in almost 100 images showing the sexual abuse of at least three boys between six and ten years old. Unlike Neil's case, there had been no apparent attempt to obscure the perpetrator's face in these images. After authorities received more than 250 leads, Wayne Nelson Corliss was arrested by U.S. Immigration and Customs Enforcement agents in New Jersey and charged with producing child pornography. He admitted to raping three boys, and was denied bail. In November 2009, he was sentenced to 19 and a half years in prison.

References 

1975 births
Living people
Canadian people convicted of child sexual abuse
Canadian people imprisoned abroad
Canadian schoolteachers
People from New Westminster
Violence against men in Asia